Bad Sugar is a British comedy pilot, written by Sam Bain and Jesse Armstrong, based on an idea by the show's stars Olivia Colman, Julia Davis and Sharon Horgan.

The programme centres on a wealthy, dysfunctional British mining dynasty, and is a parody of telenovela-style melodramas and soap operas such as Dallas.

It was shown on Channel 4 on 26 August 2012. A full series was commissioned for broadcast in 2013 but cancelled before production with problems co-ordinating the main actors' schedules cited as the reason.

References 

Channel 4 comedy
Television series by Endemol